Ausserdorfer is a surname. Notable people with the surname include:

 Anton Ausserdorfer (1836–1885), Austrian clergyman and botanical collector
 Hubert Ausserdorfer, Austrian luger